Zdeněk Bahenský (born March 10, 1986) is a Czech former professional ice hockey player. He was selected by the New York Rangers in the 3rd round (73rd overall) of the 2004 NHL Entry Draft.

Bahensky played with HC Sparta Praha in the Czech Extraliga during the 2010–11 Czech Extraliga season.

Career statistics

Regular season and playoffs

International

References

External links

1986 births
Living people
BK Mladá Boleslav players
Charlotte Checkers (1993–2010) players
Czech ice hockey forwards
Hartford Wolf Pack players
HC Karlovy Vary players
Rytíři Kladno players
HC Litvínov players
HC Most players
New York Rangers draft picks
HC Nové Zámky players
Sportspeople from Most (city)
Saskatoon Blades players
Scorpions de Mulhouse players
HC Sparta Praha players
Wipptal Broncos players
Czech expatriate ice hockey players in Canada
Czech expatriate ice hockey players in the United States
Czech expatriate ice hockey players in Slovakia
Czech expatriate sportspeople in Italy
Czech expatriate sportspeople in Romania
Czech expatriate sportspeople in France
Czech expatriate sportspeople in Poland
Expatriate ice hockey players in France
Expatriate ice hockey players in Italy
Expatriate ice hockey players in Romania
Expatriate ice hockey players in Poland